Zeferina Elsa Caupe (born 11 July 1999), known as Ngonguinha, is an Angolan footballer who plays as a forward for Tchapesse CA FC and the Angola women's national team.

Club career
Ngonguinha has played for PC Benguela and Tchapesse CA in Angola.

International career
Ngonguinha capped for Angola at the senior level during the 2021 COSAFA Women's Championship.

International goals

References

1999 births
Living people
Angolan women's footballers
Women's association football forwards
Angola women's international footballers